Boris Lovrić (born 23 June 1975) is a Croatian bobsledder. He competed in the four man event at the 2002 Winter Olympics.

References

1975 births
Living people
Croatian male bobsledders
Olympic bobsledders of Croatia
Bobsledders at the 2002 Winter Olympics
Sportspeople from Split, Croatia